The Unknown Saint is a 2019 internationally co-produced comedy-drama film directed by Alaa Eddine Aljem. It was selected as the Moroccan entry for the Best International Feature Film at the 93rd Academy Awards, but it was not nominated.

Synopsis
A robber buries his loot at the top of a hill in the desert, only to return years later to find it has become a shrine.

Cast
 Younes Bouab as The thief
 Salah Bensalah as The Brain
 Bouchaib Semmak as Hassan
 Hassan Ben Badida as The Nurse
 Mohammed Nouaimane as Brahim
 Anas El Baz as The doctor

See also
 List of submissions to the 93rd Academy Awards for Best International Feature Film
 List of Moroccan submissions for the Academy Award for Best International Feature Film

References

External links
 

2019 films

2019 comedy-drama films
Moroccan comedy-drama films
French comedy-drama films
Qatari drama films
2010s Arabic-language films
2010s French films